The Sanchez Powder House Site (also known as Powder House Lot) is a historic site in St. Augustine, Florida. It is located on Marine Street. On April 14, 1972, it was added to the U.S. National Register of Historic Places.

See also
National Register of Historic Places listings in St. Johns County, Florida

References

External links: county-specific links are broken April 2015
 St. Johns County listings at National Register of Historic Places 
 St. Johns County listings at Florida's Office of Cultural and Historical Programs

Native American history of Florida
Archaeological sites in Florida
National Register of Historic Places in St. Johns County, Florida
St. Augustine, Florida
Gunpowder magazines
Military facilities on the National Register of Historic Places in Florida
1972 establishments in Florida